Anne Heraty is an Irish business woman. She is co-founder, major stake-holder and also CEO of CPL Resources.

CPL

In 1989 Heraty and Keith O'Malley founded Computer Placement Ltd. a company placing people at IT companies that were starting to set up businesses in Ireland. In 1992 she takes over all shares from other stake-holders (including O'Malley) and from then on she own's 100% of the shares in CPL.

In 1996 Heraty's husband, Paul Carrol, joins the group and in 1999 they decide to bring CPL to the market: CPL Resources Plc. starts trading on the Irish Stock Exchange and the London Stock Exchange. With this Heraty becomes the first female CEO of an Irish company floated on the stock-exchange.

Heraty announced she would be standing down as CEO of CPL Resources on January 1, 2022.

Business women of the year
Due to her position as first female CEO of a listed Irish company she gets known to the larger public. In 2006 she wins the Ernst & Young Businesswomen of the year award and according to the website 'Business and Leadership'' she ranks number 26 on the list of most powerful women in Ireland.

Over the years this status results in her being asked to become member of several boards of directors with other companies. The most important involvements are:
 non-executive director  of Anglo Irish Bank
 non-executive director  of Irish Stock Exchange
 non-executive director  of Forfas
 non-executive director  of Bord na Mona

Anglo Irish Bank
The most well-known position outside CPL is her role at Anglo Irish Bank. Relatively early in the downfall of the bank, shortly after the state took over ownership, Heraty stepped down from the board.

Other board-memberships
Within a week of stepping down at Anglo she also quits her non-exec directorships at Forfas and Bord na Mona.

Herarty is a board member of Ibec, Ireland's largest business organisation and lobbying group.

References

1961 births
Living people
Irish bankers
20th-century Irish businesswomen
21st-century Irish businesswomen